Shek Kwu Lung is the name of two villages in Hong Kong:

 Shek Kwu Lung (Sha Tin District) in Siu Lek Yuen, Sha Tin District
 Shek Kwu Lung (Tai Po District) in Tai Po District